The Epping to Chatswood rail link (ECRL) (originally a part of the Parramatta Rail Link (PRL) proposal) is a railway line in the northern suburbs of Sydney, Australia, which connects Epping station on the Northern line with Chatswood on the North Shore line. It was formerly considered its own railway line, but is now considered part of the Metro North West Line.

The 13 km line runs completely underground and includes three intermediate stations: Macquarie University, Macquarie Park and North Ryde. The junction stations at Epping and Chatswood both underwent major redevelopments to incorporate the new link.

It was in service for less than a decade, opening in February 2009 and closing in September 2018. The vast majority of the infrastructure was incorporated into the Metro North West Line of the Sydney Metro network. The conversion took place as part of the Sydney Metro Northwest project.

Earlier proposals
There have been proposals for a railway between Sydney's North Shore and the Main Northern lines since September 1920, when John Bradfield's plans were put forward for a railway between St Leonards and Eastwood. After political moves, and potential engineering difficulties with hills south of Eastwood station in the 1930s, the terminus was changed to Epping, where the line became known as the "Epping-St Leonards Railway". To this end, the State Government resumed several of the estate houses in Epping around the present-day Brigg and Albuera Roads for a track to loop the line into the main line and terminate the trains at Epping. When voters in neighbouring Eastwood then complained, the line was proposed to link south of Eastwood, use island platforms at Eastwood and then link to Epping.

In 1929, local real estate agents promoted land sales along the railway line at Epping in preparation for the construction of the line. They called the area "Epping Junction", on account of the station being a junction between the Epping-St Leonards Line and the Main Northern Line. A new island platform was also built in preparation for the terminus of the new line. The track was to be in the middle of the two Main Northern line platforms, and until the 1970s still existed as a terminating line.

The effects of the Great Depression, however, soon meant that the line would not be economically feasible, and despite protests by local residents and the local member, Major Shand, the project was abandoned. In its place, a road was built between St Leonards and Epping, which is the current Epping Road. The land sales were a complete failure, and the lots around the railway were not sold until the 1950s and 1960s.

It was not until the 1990s that plans for the line were resurrected. An original proposal to run from Westmead to St Leonards, via Epping was considered, but in 1998 the Parramatta Rail Link was announced as part of the NSW Government's Action for Transport 2010 plan. The line was to run from Chatswood through Epping to Parramatta, partially travelling along the underutilised Carlingford surface line which would be expanded from single-track to dual-track. This proposal included optional stations at Delhi Road and UTS Kuring-gai and would be served by eight services an hour. Construction was planned to commence in late 1999, with the line to open in 2006.

Construction 

Construction of the PRL began with the Chatswood to Epping section, which commenced in November 2002.

In August 2003, the NSW Transport Minister, Michael Costa, announced that the Epping-Parramatta section would be postponed indefinitely. The delaying of this section was justified on the grounds that the expected daily patronage of 15,000 passenger trips did not justify the project's $1.2 billion cost. The government feared that the line would be under-utilised, much as the Airport Link (a public-private project) had been. There also had been community protest against the routing of the line through Parramatta Park (one of three possible routes supplied by the government). The government later announced the construction of a passing loop as part of the Rail Clearways Program on the Carlingford line, which would have allowed a half-hourly frequency all day, however this project was cancelled in November 2008.

Originally, there was to be a bridge over the Lane Cove River, instead of a tunnel beneath it, but the government adopted the tunnel option due to community and environmentalist pressure. This required the elimination of the planned station at the University of Technology, Sydney, Kuring-gai Campus; the required increased depth of the tunnel to go under the river made a station at that point impractical, due to the required depth of the escalator shafts.

Thiess and Hochtief delivered the project as a joint venture which included the design and construction of a driven railway and four fully mined stations. The line consists of two tunnels – one for each track. The tunnels were constructed using two tunnel boring machines, with a section underneath the Lane Cove River being constructed by the cut and cover method (next to where Delhi Road crosses the River). The line is fully bi-directional, with three crossovers to allow trains to switch tracks in the event of a disruption. The tunnels include a walkway on one side, at platform height.

Several associated works were also completed to coincide with the opening of the new line. These include the rebuilt Chatswood interchange, a major upgrade at Epping, an upgrade of North Sydney station, the Hornsby turnback Rail Clearways project and new substations at Waverton and Beecroft.

Issues
In December 2007, it was announced that Tangara trains would not be running on the line due to steepness of the tunnel. The line owner, RailCorp, has denied that this is an engineering bungle, saying "The Tangara trains, because they are not ideally suited to that steep gradient, will not be allocated to that line even though they can operate." S set trains were also excluded, due to concerns over possible problems performing "push-out" duty (a loaded train pushing out another loaded train) on the gradients. On 23 October 2008 it was also confirmed during testing that sound levels on the train were 90 decibels, as loud as a 737 plane coming into land. Plans to rectify this would come at a cost that has already blown out from $1.4 billion to $2.3 billion.
In July 2009 it was reported that drivers were being restricted to two return shuttle runs through the tunnel before taking a break as well being instructed to keep the lights on in the driver's cabin and lower the side window blinds in order to avoid a possible stroboscopic effect caused by the tunnel lighting, with claims it may have caused headaches, dizziness, fatigue and nausea.

Initial service 

The line opened on 23 February 2009 as a shuttle service between Epping and Chatswood. The launch was moved from 22 February due to a National Day of Mourning for the victims of Victoria's Black Saturday bushfires. The line operated free of charge until 8 June 2009. Initially passengers could use a blue Complementary Pass, or buy a ticket to either Chatswood or Epping if coming from outside the new link. Later on, the automatic gates at the new stations were switched on and passengers were required to "buy" a ticket as usual. A portion of the fare was automatically deducted for passengers travelling to or from stations beyond the new link.

OSCARS (Outer Suburban Cars), were used on the shuttle service, running as four-car sets. These were the newest trains in the fleet and are intended for longer journeys out of the Sydney basin, but were used on the ECRL due to the steepness and noisiness of the tunnel. Other types maintained at Hornsby Maintenance Depot were not used during the shuttle phase, though tests with K sets proved successful. Trains operated at 15-minute intervals, with the last service departing Epping at 9:31 pm. The line was coloured black on CityRail maps and publicity materials during the shuttle period, which ended on 11 October 2009 when a new timetable was introduced.

Integrated service 

Once integrated services commenced, the link became part of the Northern Line. Most Northern Line trains from Hornsby to Epping operated via the new link and then continued along the North Shore Line from Chatswood to the city, before returning to Epping via Strathfield. Trains reversed at Epping's above ground platforms, and followed the opposite route back to Hornsby. Services were operated by K sets, with some OSCARS used during off-peak periods. The timetable had four trains per hour on weekdays between Hornsby and the City via the ECRL. On weekends, 4 trains per hour ran between Hornsby and Chatswood with two of these continuing from Chatswood to the city, and then to Epping via Strathfield.

On 20 October 2013, the Northern Line was replaced by the North Shore, Northern & Western Line. On weekdays, this saw the ECRL served by trains running from Hornsby to Richmond or Emu Plains. On weekends, the Hornsby to Epping loop was retained.

The ECRL was also used by trains on the Central Coast & Newcastle Line if the Main North Line between Strathfield and Epping was affected by trackwork or a major service interruption.

Conversion to Sydney Metro
In February 2010, the New South Wales Government re-announced the North West Rail Link as a conventional mainline railway, connected with the ECRL at Epping.

On 11 August 2010, Prime Minister Julia Gillard announced $2.1 billion in funding for the Epping to Parramatta Rail Link with $520 million to be contributed by the NSW Government. (a revisit of the 1998 NSW Government announcement, which despite a detailed report in 2003 was abandoned earlier in 2010 by the NSW Keneally Government). Work on the line was expected to begin in 2011 and the line was scheduled to be operational by 2017. The state opposition indicated it wished to instead use the federal money to construct the North West Rail Link, should it win the March 2011 state election. The federal government did not support this proposal and said the money should be used to construct the line to Parramatta as it originally proposed. Following the defeat of the Keneally Government in 2011, the proposal was abandoned.

The new O'Farrell Government continued planning for the North West Rail Link. During the planning process, it was announced that the project would be switched from a mainline railway to a metro rapid transit service. The North West Rail Link - renamed Sydney Metro Northwest - would still connect to the Epping to Chatswood line infrastructure, which would be converted to metro standards.

The ECRL closed on 29 September 2018, allowing conversion to commence. The conversion of the former ECRL took eight months; temporary bus services were provided during this time. The Metro North West Line (including the former ECRL stations) opened on 26 May 2019. The former Northern line route from Hornsby to Central via Strathfield was reinstated, and North Shore services that plied the rail link were amended to operate beyond Chatswood towards Gordon, Hornsby or Berowra.

Gallery

References

External links 
 Photographs of the first train to run on the line

Buildings and structures awarded the Sir John Sulman Medal
Closed railway lines in Sydney
Railway lines opened in 2009
Railway lines closed in 2018
Railway tunnels in New South Wales
Standard gauge railways in Australia
2009 establishments in Australia
2018 disestablishments in Australia
Tunnels in Sydney